Anthony Reategui is a professional poker player from Chandler, Arizona. A graduate from Chandler High School, Anthony worked at a Mesa, Arizona car washing facility before his poker career. He most notably place 2nd in the $2,500 No Limit Hold'em event and 1st in the $1,500 No Limit Hold'em Shootout at the 2006 World Series of Poker.

As of 2008, his total live tournament winnings exceed $1,200,000. His 5 cashes as the WSOP account for $648,210 of those winnings.

Notes

External links
 Hendon Mob tournament results

American poker players
Living people
World Series of Poker bracelet winners
Year of birth missing (living people)
People from Chandler, Arizona